Dalmo may refer to:

 DALMO, Daru-Al-Moameneen, Islamic organization for South West England
 Dalmo (footballer, 1932–2015), Dalmo Gaspar, Brazilian football left-back
 David Dalmo (born 1972), Swedish dancer
 Dalmo (footballer, born 1984), Dalmo Inácio da Silva, Brazilian football striker